Chunga is one of two known genera of seriemas in the family Cariamidae. It is found in Argentina, Bolivia, and Paraguay. It contains one living species, the black-legged seriema. A prehistoric species, Chunga incerta, has been described from the Miocene and Pliocene Monte Hermoso Formation of Argentina.

References

 
Cariamidae
Seriemas
Bird genera
Bird genera with one living species
Miocene first appearances
Birds of South America
Taxa named by Gustav Hartlaub